The George Apfel Round Barn near Clinton, Wisconsin, United States, is a round barn that was built in 1914.  It was listed on the National Register of Historic Places in 2006.

Another barn of the octagonal-round type, in Wisconsin, is the Dean-Armstrong-Englund Octagonal Barn, built c.1889-93, northeast of Lima, in Rock County.

References

Barns on the National Register of Historic Places in Wisconsin
Buildings and structures in Vernon County, Wisconsin
Infrastructure completed in 1914
Octagonal buildings in the United States
Round barns in Wisconsin
National Register of Historic Places in Vernon County, Wisconsin